Finger Lakes Community College (FLCC) is a public community college in Canandaigua, New York.  It is affiliated with the State University of New York and sponsored by Ontario County. The main campus is just east of the City of Canandaigua, with additional campus centers in Victor, Geneva, and Newark to serve the needs of Ontario County, Wayne County, Yates County and Seneca County in the Finger Lakes region of New York.

History

 
Finger Lakes Community College was established in 1965 and opened in 1967 as the Community College of the Finger Lakes (CCFL) in a storefront "campus" in Canandaigua, NY. The college now has affiliated housing in the 356 bed Suites at Laker Landing, adjacent to the campus. In Fall 2010, FLCC's headcount enrollment was 6,935 the highest in its history.

In July 2009, FLCC received a $1 Million gift from Constellation Brands and the Sands Family, the largest gift in the school's history. The main road leading to the campus was renamed Marvin Sands Drive in honor of Marvin Sands, the Sands' family patriarch and the Sands' family's dedication to FLCC and the region. In Fall 2009, FLCC named another "loop" road, connecting Marvin Sands Drive and "D" parking lot, Laker Lane after the college's athletic teams.

Expansion
Construction of the Student Life Center began in early 2010; and opened in spring of 2012. The upper floors of the original building have been renovated into classrooms and music recording technology spaces as part of the approximately $45 million project.

Enrollment in 2015 was 6,761,.

Presidents

Academics

FLCC is accredited by the Commission on Higher Education of the Middle States Association of Colleges and Schools, and the National League for Nursing. All programs of instruction are registered with the Office of Higher Education of the New York State Education department.

Finger Lakes Community College also operates the Muller Field Station at the southern end of Honeoye Lake which serves as an outdoor education facility, the East Hill Campus, in Naples, New York, site of the college's Wildland Fire Suppression Program, and the FLCC Viticulture and Wine Center in Geneva, New York.

Athletics
The Lakers are a non-scholarship member of the National Junior College Athletic Association (NJCAA), Division III, and the Mid-State Athletic Conference, Finger Lakes Community College competes against two-year institutions throughout the state.

Teams compete in:

 Baseball
 Women's/men's basketball
 Women's/men's cross country
 Men's lacrosse
 Women's/men's soccer
 Women's/men's track
 Softball
 Women's volleyball
 Woodsmen

Intercollegiate Woodsmen competition requires the same serious conditioning and development of team play essential for any sport. The co-educational woodsmen squad was established at Finger Lakes Community College in 1974. Since 1982, the women's team has earned 11 championship titles and the men have earned 13, more than any other school in the fifty-two-year history of the sport. In Woodsmen competition the FLCC Team competes against both two- and four-year colleges and universities.

References

External links

Official website

Two-year colleges in the United States
SUNY community colleges
U.S. Route 20
Educational institutions established in 1965
Education in Ontario County, New York
Education in Wayne County, New York
Education in Yates County, New York
Education in Seneca County, New York
1965 establishments in New York (state)
NJCAA athletics